is a song by The Blue Hearts, released as the band's fifteenth single. It reached #47 on the Oricon charts in 1993. It was part of the band's sixth album, Stick Out. The music and lyrics were written by Masatoshi Mashima.

Details
Ore wa Ore no Shi o Shinitai (俺は俺の死を死にたい I Want to Die My Death) was also written by Mashima, who also performed the vocals on this track. This B-side version is slightly different from the version recorded on Stick Out.

"1001 no Violin" is an orchestral version of "1000 no Violin" and was arranged by Asuka Kaneko (金子飛鳥 Kaneko Asuka).

References

The Blue Hearts songs
1993 singles
Songs written by Masatoshi Mashima
1993 songs